The 1934 Arizona gubernatorial election took place on November 6, 1934. Incumbent Governor Benjamin Baker Moeur ran for reelection, he was challenged by former governor George W. P. Hunt and future Governor Rawghlie Clement Stanford in the Democratic primary, but he defeated both of them by a comfortable margin.

Benjamin Baker Moeur defeated Arizona State Highway Engineer and former Arizona Republican Party Chairman Thomas Maddock in the general election, and was sworn into his second term as governor on January 2, 1934.

Democratic primary
The Democratic primary took place on September 11, 1934. Incumbent governor Benjamin Baker Moeur, who was elected to his first term over then-incumbent governor George W. P. Hunt in 1932 (whom Mouer defeated in the Democratic primary), was opposed in the primary again by Hunt, as well as former judge of the Maricopa County Superior Court Rawghlie Clement Stanford and State Senator James Minotto. This Democratic primary was interesting in that it included the current governor, a former governor, and a future governor.

This was former governor George W. P. Hunt's final run for Governor of Arizona, as he died later that year, on December 24, 1934.

Candidates
 Benjamin Baker Moeur, incumbent governor
 George W. P. Hunt, former governor, former ambassador to Siam
 Rawghlie Clement Stanford, former judge of the Maricopa County Superior Court
 James Minotto, state senator

Results

Republican primary

Candidates
 Thomas Maddock, Arizona State Highway Engineer, former Arizona Republican Party Chair, State Legislator

General election

References

Bibliography

1934
1934 United States gubernatorial elections
Gubernatorial
November 1934 events